This is a list of people who have served as Custos Rotulorum of Cumberland.

 Anthony Barwys bef. 1544 – aft. 1547
 Thomas Salkeld bef. 1558 – aft. 1562
 Sir Thomas Dacre bef. 1564–1566
 Henry Scrope, 9th Baron Scrope of Bolton bef. 1577–1592
 Thomas Scrope, 10th Baron Scrope of Bolton 1592 – aft. 1596
 Francis Clifford, 4th Earl of Cumberland bef. 1605–1641
 George Dalston 1641–1643
 Henry Howard, Lord Maltravers 1643–1652
 Interregnum
 Charles Howard, 1st Earl of Carlisle 1660–1685
 Thomas Tufton, 6th Earl of Thanet 1685–1689
 John Lowther, 1st Viscount Lonsdale 1689–1700
 Charles Howard, 3rd Earl of Carlisle 1700–1714
 Thomas Tufton, 6th Earl of Thanet 1714–1715
 Charles Howard, 3rd Earl of Carlisle 1715–1738
 Henry Lowther, 3rd Viscount Lonsdale 1738–1751
 Charles Wyndham, 2nd Earl of Egremont 1751–1763
 vacant
 James Lowther, 1st Earl of Lonsdale 1765–1802
For later custodes rotulorum, see Lord Lieutenant of Cumberland.

References
Institute of Historical Research - Custodes Rotulorum 1544-1646
Institute of Historical Research - Custodes Rotulorum 1660-1828

Cumberland